Animaniacs is a children's animated television program that ran from 1993 to 1998.  Over the show's course, several VHS collections were released, and DVD boxed sets were released as well.

VHS 
Several VHS videos were released in the United States, in the United Kingdom and Australia.  All of these videos are out of print, but are still available at some online sellers.  The episodes in the VHS "volumes" were generally jumbled at random and are in no particular order with the series.  The other videotapes (with the exception of Animaniacs Stew) feature episodes that had focused on one general subject. Each video featured four to five skits each and was accompanied by a handful of skit intros, with a running time of about 45 minutes.

United States

United Kingdom, Czech Republic, Russia, Greece

Poland

DVD 
Volume 1 of Animaniacs had sold very well; over half of the product being sold in the first week made it one of the fastest-selling animation DVD sets that Warner Home Video ever put out. In 2018, all 99 episodes, as well as the film Animaniacs: Wakko's Wish, were released in a single complete DVD boxed set by Warner Home Video. All of the releases feature unedited episodes (except for "Moon Over Minerva" and "Broadcast Nuisance").

References

External links 
 The official DVD website

Home Video
Lists of home video releases